"When and Where" is a song written by Jeff Pennig, Jess Brown and Brett Jones, and recorded by American country music group Confederate Railroad.  It was released in May 1995 as the first single and title track from the album When and Where.  The song reached #24 on the Billboard Hot Country Singles & Tracks chart.

Chart performance

References

1995 singles
1995 songs
Confederate Railroad songs
Song recordings produced by Barry Beckett
Atlantic Records singles
Songs written by Jess Brown
Songs written by Brett Jones (songwriter)
Songs written by Jeff Pennig